Le Lion-d'Angers is a commune in the Maine-et-Loire department in western France. On 1 January 2016, the former commune of Andigné was merged into Le Lion-d'Angers.

Geography
The river Oudon forms part of the commune's southern border before joining the river Mayenne, which forms part of the commune's eastern border.

Population
The population data given in the table below refer to the commune in its geography as of January 2020.

See also
Communes of the Maine-et-Loire department

References

Liondangers
Anjou